Araz Alizadeh (3 November 1951 – 6 October 2022) was an Azerbaijani politician. A member of the Azerbaijani Social Democratic Party, he served on the Supreme Soviet of Azerbaijan from 1991 to 1995.

Alizadeh died in Baku on 6 October 2022, at the age of 70.

References

1951 births
2022 deaths
Azerbaijani translators
Azerbaijani politicians
Members of the Supreme Soviet of the Azerbaijan Soviet Socialist Republic
Azerbaijani Social Democratic Party politicians
Members of the 5th convocation of the National Assembly (Azerbaijan)
Baku State University alumni
Politicians from Baku